Michael Richman (born June 23, 1985) is an American mixed martial artist currently competing in the Lightweight division of the Legacy Fighting Alliance. A professional competitor in mixed martial arts since 2008, Richman has competed for Bellator MMA, and is also 2-0 as a professional boxer. Richman currently competes as a bare-knuckle boxer with Bare Knuckle Fighting Championship.

Background
Born and raised in Rosemount, Minnesota, began competing in wrestling from a young age and was also a fan of boxing and mixed martial arts. Richman attended Rosemount High School where he competed in wrestling before joining the United States Marine Corps upon graduating. After serving three tours as an infantryman in Iraq and reaching the rank of Sergeant, Richman began training in mixed martial arts in 2008.

Mixed martial arts career

Early career
Richman made his professional debut in 2008 and compiled an undefeated record of 8-0 before competing on The Ultimate Fighter: Team GSP vs. Team Koscheck.

The Ultimate Fighter
Richman was one of 32 contestants selected to compete on The Ultimate Fighter: Team GSP vs. Team Koscheck. In his opening bout to get into the house, Richman lost to Aaron Wilkinson by unanimous decision after two rounds.

Bellator MMA
Richman made his Bellator MMA debut against WEC veteran Chris Horodecki at Bellator 64. In a huge upset, Richman won via KO at 1:23 of the first round.

After his win over Horodecki, Richman competed in the Bellator Season Seven Featherweight Tournament. In the quarterfinal round at Bellator 76, Richman defeated Jeremy Spoon via head KO 23 seconds into the first round.  In the semifinals, he faced Shahbulat Shamhalaev and lost via brutal KO in the first round.

Richman proved he was the superior fighter in his Bellator 88 Featherweight Tournament Quarterfinal bout against Mitch Jackson. Richman won a decisive first-round TKO victory. Richman dominated Jackson on his feet, dropping him three times with short left hooks.

Richman faced Alexandre Bezerra in the semifinals on March 7, 2013 at Bellator 92. He won the bout via split decision.

Richman faced Magomedrasul Khasbulaev in the Bellator Featherweight Tournament Final on April 4, 2013 in Atlantic City. He lost the fight via unanimous decision.

Richman faced Akop Stepanyan at Bellator 106 on November 2, 2013. Richman had been in trouble early in the fight, but floored Stepanyan with a left hook in the first round. He then faced Desmond Green at Bellator 110 in the quarter-finals of the Featherweight Tournament. Richman lost via unanimous decision.

Richman faced Goiti Yamauchi on May 17, 2014 at Bellator 120. He lost the back-and-forth fight via unanimous decision.

In the fall of 2014, Richman moved down to the bantamweight division.  He debuted at 135 against Ed West at Bellator 126 on September 26, 2014. He won the fight via knockout in the first round.  He also made his signature 'walk-off knockout', where he backs off the fighter before referee called stoppage on the fight.

Richman faced promotional newcomer Nam Phan at Bellator 131 on November 15, 2014. He won the fight via knockout in the first round.

Richman was expected to face former Bellator Bantamweight Champion Eduardo Dantas at Bellator 135 on March 27, 2015. However, the bout was removed from the fight card after Richman suffered an undisclosed injury. The fight eventually took place at Bellator 137 on May 15, 2015. Richman lost the back-and-forth fight by unanimous decision.

On June 9, 2015 the California State Athletic Commission confirmed that Richman had failed a post fight drug test following his fight against Eduardo Dantas at Bellator 137. He tested positive for performance-enhancing drugs according to CSAC Executive Director Andy Foster and will be suspended two years and fined $2,500 for the rule infraction.

Bare-knuckle boxing

BKB
Following his suspension from mixed martial arts, Richman ventured into bare-knuckle boxing. At the time, the sport was still illegal in the United States so he traveled to the United Kingdom for his first fight under the BKB promotion on June 9, 2018.

Valor Bare Knuckle
Richman had his first bare-knuckle fight on US soil at Valor Bare Knuckle 1 on September 21, 2019. His fight with JC Llamas ended in a no contest after an accidental headbutt inflicted a cut above Llamas' eye and rendered him unable to continue.

Bare Knuckle Fighting Championship 
Richman made his Bare Knuckle Fighting Championship debut against Marcel Stamps on April 30, 2021 at BKFC 17. He won by first-round technical knockout via shoulder injury.   

He next faced Dakota Cochrane on September 10, 2021 at BKFC 21, whom he defeated by second-round knockout. 

Richman faced David Rickels on April 8, 2022 at BKFC 23, winning by second-round knockout.

Interim BKFC Light Heavyweight Champion
After three consecutive victories, Richman was set to face Isaac Doolitle for the interim BKFC Light Heavyweight Championship on October 15, 2022 at BKFC 31. He won the fight and interim title via third-round knockout.

As interim champion, Richman was scheduled to face reigning champion Lorenzo Hunt in a title unification bout at KnuckleMania 3 on February 17, 2023. Despite knocking Hunt down in the first round, Richman was knocked out and suffered the first loss of his bare-knuckle boxing career.

Championships and accomplishments
Bare Knuckle Fighting Championship 
Interim BKFC Light Heavyweight Champion (One time) 

Bellator Fighting Championships
Bellator Season Eight Featherweight Tournament Runner-Up

Mixed martial arts record

|-
| Loss
| align=center| 18-8
| Jeff Peterson
| Decision (unanimous)
| Legacy Fighting Alliance 29
| 
| align=center| 3
| align=center| 5:00
| Prior Lake, Minnesota, United States
|Moved up to Lightweight.
|-
| Loss
| align=center| 18-7
| Lazar Stojadinovic
| Decision (unanimous)
| Legacy Fighting Alliance 2
| 
| align=center| 3
| align=center| 5:00
| Prior Lake, Minnesota, United States
|Moved up to Featherweight.
|-
| Loss
| align=center| 18–6
| Eduardo Dantas
| Decision (unanimous)
| Bellator 137
| 
| align=center| 3
| align=center| 5:00
| Temecula, California, United States
| 
|-
| Win
|align=center| 18–5
|Nam Phan
|KO (punches)
|Bellator 131
|
|align=center|1
|align=center|0:46
|San Diego, California, United States
|
|-
|Win
|align=center|17–5
|Ed West
|KO (punches)
|Bellator 126
|
|align=center|1
|align=center|2:44
|Phoenix, Arizona, United States
|
|-
|Loss
|align=center|16–5
|Goiti Yamauchi
|Decision (unanimous)
|Bellator 120
|
|align=center|3
|align=center|5:00
|Southaven, Mississippi, United States
|
|-
|Loss
|align=center|16–4
|Desmond Green
|Decision (unanimous)
|Bellator 110
|
|align=center|3
|align=center|5:00
|Uncasville, Connecticut, United States
|
|-
|Win
|align=center|16–3
|Akop Stepanyan
|TKO (punches)
|Bellator 106
|
|align=center|1
|align=center|4:05
|Long Beach, California, United States
|
|-
|Loss
|align=center|15–3
|Magomedrasul Khasbulaev
|Decision (unanimous)
|Bellator 95
|
|align=center|3
|align=center|5:00
|Atlantic City, New Jersey, United States
|
|-
|Win
|align=center|15–2
|Alexandre Bezerra
|Decision (split)
|Bellator 92
|
|align=center|3
|align=center|5:00
|Temecula, California, United States
|
|-
|Win
|align=center|14–2
|Mitch Jackson
|TKO (head kick and punches)
|Bellator 88
|
|align=center|1
|align=center|4:57
|Duluth, Georgia, United States
|
|-
|Loss
|align=center|13–2
|Shahbulat Shamhalaev
|KO (punches)
|Bellator 79
|
|align=center|1
|align=center|1:45
|Rama, Ontario, Canada
|
|-
|Win
|align=center|13–1
|Jeremy Spoon
|KO (head kick and punch)
|Bellator 76
|
|align=center|1
|align=center|0:23
|Windsor, Ontario, Canada
|
|-
|Win
|align=center|12–1
|Chris Horodecki
|KO (punches)
|Bellator 64
|
|align=center|1
|align=center|1:23
|Windsor, Ontario, Canada
|
|-
|Win
|align=center|11–1
|Morgan Sickinger
|Decision (unanimous)
|Driller Promotions / SEG: Downtown Showdown 1
|
|align=center|3
|align=center|5:00
|Minneapolis, Minnesota, United States
|
|-
|Win
|align=center|10–1
|Christopher Lane
|TKO (punches)
|Riot at the Hyatt: Packer vs. Viking
|
|align=center|1
|align=center|1:43
|Minneapolis, Minnesota, United States
|
|-
|Loss
|align=center|9–1
|Brian Pearman
|Decision (split)
|Seconds Out / Vivid MMA: Showdown at the Sheraton 2
|
|align=center|3
|align=center|5:00
|Bloomington, Minnesota, United States
|
|-
|Win
|align=center|9–0
|Mike Lindquist
|Submission (rear-naked choke)
|Seconds Out / Vivid MMA: Combat on Capital Hill 4
|
|align=center|1
|align=center|1:14
|Saint Paul, Minnesota, United States
|
|-
|Win
|align=center|8–0
|Ryan Stock
|TKO (punches)
|Seconds Out / Vivid MMA: Tour of Duty 1
|
|align=center|1
|align=center|1:14
|Saint Paul, Minnesota, United States
|
|-
|Win
|align=center|7–0
|Derek Getzel
|Submission (anaconda choke)
|Ambition Promotions: The Crucible
|
|align=center|1
|align=center|3:36
|Saint Paul, Minnesota, United States
|
|-
|Win
|align=center|6–0
|Wes Ronchi
|Submission (triangle choke)
|Brutaal: Fight Night
|
|align=center|2
|align=center|0:42
|Shakopee, Minnesota, United States
|
|-
|Win
|align=center|5–0
|Chris Coplan
|Submission (rear-naked choke)
|Brutaal: Fight Night
|
|align=center|1
|align=center|3:07
|Shakopee, Minnesota, United States
|
|-
|Win
|align=center|4–0
|Deryck Ripley
|Submission
|Brutaal: Fight Night
|
|align=center|1
|align=center|4:50
|Shakopee, Minnesota, United States
|
|-
|Win
|align=center|3–0
|Mel Ott
|Submission (armbar)
|Brutaal: Fight Night
|
|align=center|1
|align=center|1:10
|Shakopee, Minnesota, United States
|
|-
|Win
|align=center|2–0
|Rob Degroot
|Submission (armbar)
|Brutaal: Fight Night
|
|align=center|1
|align=center|0:48
|Shakopee, Minnesota, United States
|
|-
|-
|Win
|align=center|1–0
|Jason Trett
|TKO (punches)
|Brutaal: Fight Night
|
|align=center|1
|align=center|1:45
|Shakopee, Minnesota, United States
|

Bare knuckle boxing record

|-
|Loss
|align=center|5–1 (1) 
|Lorenzo Hunt
|KO (punch)
|BKFC KnuckleMania 3
|
|align=center|1
|align=center|1:50 
|Albuquerque, New Mexico, United States
|
|-
|Win
|align=center|5–0 (1)
|Isaac Doolittle	
|KO (punch)
|BKFC 31
|
|align=center|3
|align=center|1:35
|Broomfield, Colorado, United States
||
|-
|Win
|align=center|4–0 (1)
|David Rickels
|KO (punch)
|BKFC 23
| 
|align=center|2
|align=center|0:32
|Wichita, Kansas, United States
|
|-
|Win
|align=center|3–0 (1)
|Dakota Cochrane
|KO (punch)
|BKFC 21
|
|align=center|2
|align=center|0:37
|Omaha, Nebraska, United States
|
|-
|Win
|align=center|2–0 (1) 
|Marcel Stamps
|KO (punch)
|BKFC 17
|
|align=center|1
|align=center|1:06
|Birmingham, Alabama, United States
|-
|NC
|align=center|1–0 (1) 
|JC Llamas
|NC (accidental headbutt) 
|Valor Bare Knuckle 1 
|
|align=center|1
|align=center|3:00 
|New Town, North Dakota, United States
| 
|-
|Win
|align=center|1–0
|Marcus Gaines
|TKO 
|BKB 11 
|
|align=center|2
|align=center|N/A
|London, England, United States
|
|-

See also
List of Bellator MMA alumni
List of male mixed martial artists

References

External links

Official website

1985 births
Living people
People from Rosemount, Minnesota
American male mixed martial artists
Mixed martial artists from Minnesota
Lightweight mixed martial artists
Featherweight mixed martial artists
Bantamweight mixed martial artists
Mixed martial artists utilizing wrestling
Bare-knuckle boxers
American male boxers
American male sport wrestlers
Amateur wrestlers
Sportspeople from Minnesota
American sportspeople in doping cases
Doping cases in mixed martial arts